Samuel Kummer (born 27 February 1968, in Stuttgart) is a German church organist.

Life 
Kummer studied Church music at the State University of Music and Performing Arts Stuttgart.

References

External links 
 
 
 

German classical organists
1968 births
Living people
Musicians from Stuttgart